The 1979 New England Patriots season was the franchise's 10th season in the National Football League and 20th overall. The Patriots ended the season with a record of nine wins and seven losses and finished second in the AFC East Division. Ron Erhardt was named the Patriots the new coach. In their season opener, the Patriots faced the Pittsburgh Steelers on Monday Night as Darryl Stingley returned to Schaffer Stadium. Patriots fans gave the paralyzed star a long sustained standing ovation. However, the emotion did not carry over as the Pats lost 16-13 in overtime. The Pats would find themselves at 8-4, as the team featured a more wide-open offense under quarterback Steve Grogan. However, a three-game losing streak ended their playoff chances, as the team settled for a disappointing 9–7 season.

Offseason

NFL Draft

Personnel

Staff

Roster

Regular season

Schedule

Standings

Season summary

Week 1 vs Steelers

Week 2 vs Jets

Week 3 at Bengals

Week 4 vs Chargers

Week 5 at Packers

Week 6 vs Lions

Week 7 at Bears

Week 8 vs Dolphins

Week 9 at Colts

Week 10 at Bills

Week 11 at Broncos

Week 12 vs Colts

Week 13 vs Bills

Week 14 at Dolphins

Week 15 at Jets

Week 16 vs Vikings

See also 
 New England Patriots seasons

New England Patriots
New England Patriots seasons
New England Patriots
Sports competitions in Foxborough, Massachusetts